Superfluidity is a phenomenon where a fluid, or a fraction of a fluid, loses all its viscosity and can flow without resistance. This article is about thin films of such superfluids.

Superfluid helium, for example, forms a 30-nm-thick film on the surface of any container. The film's properties cause the helium to climb the walls of the container and, if this is not closed, flow out.

Superfluidity and superconductivity are macroscopic manifestations of quantum mechanics. There is considerable interest, both theoretical and practical, in these quantum phase transitions. There has been a tremendous amount of work done in the field of phase transitions and critical phenomena in two dimensions.  Much of the interest in this field is because as the number of dimensions increases, the number of exactly solvable models diminishes drastically. In three or more dimensions one must resort to a mean field theory approach.  The theory of superfluid transitions in two dimensions is known as the Kosterlitz-Thouless (KT) theory. The 2D XY model - where the order parameter is characterized by an amplitude and a phase - is the universality class for this transition.

Experimental methods

In looking at phase transitions in thin films, specifically helium, the two main experimental signatures are the superfluid fraction and heat capacity. If either of these measurements were to be done on a superfluid film in a typical open container, the film signal would be overwhelmed by the background signal from the container. Therefore, when studying superfluid films, it is of paramount importance to study a system of large surface area as to enhance the film signal. 
There are several ways of doing this. In the first, a long thin strip of material such as PET film is rolled up into a "jelly roll" configuration. The result is a film that is a long continuous plane, referred to as a planar film. A second way is to have a highly porous material such as porous gold, Vycor, or Aerogel. This results in a multiply connected film where the substrate is much like Swiss cheese with the holes interconnected.  These porous materials all have an extremely high surface area to volume ratio. A third method is to separate two extremely flat plates by a thin spacer, again resulting in a large surface area to volume ratio. 

One can measure the superfluid response of the film by measuring the moment of inertia. An indispensable tool for this is the Torsional Oscillator, and early design was first used by Andronikashvili to detect superfluid in bulk fluid 4He and later modified by John Reppy and co-workers at Cornell in the 1970s. In the torsional oscillator, the experimental volume is suspended by a torsion rod and made to oscillate at resonance via capacitive coupling with a fin or pair of fins, depending on the configuration (shown below in grey). When part of the film becomes superfluid, it no longer has any viscosity and will remain at rest in the lab frame, lowering the moment of inertia of the cell. Therefore, lowering the moment of inertia reduces the resonant period of the oscillator. By measuring the period drop as a function of temperature, and total loading of the film from the empty cell value, one can deduce the fraction of the film that has entered the superfluid state. A typical set of data clearly showing the superfluid decoupling in helium films is shown in ref. 2.

A typical torsional oscillator has a resonant frequency on the order of 1000 Hz. This corresponds to a maximum velocity of the substrate of micrometres per second. The critical velocity of helium films is reported to be on the order of 0.1 m/s . Therefore, in comparison to the critical velocity, the oscillator is almost at rest. To probe theories of dynamical aspects of thin film phase transitions one must use an oscillator with a much higher frequency. The quartz crystal microbalance provides just such a tool having a resonant frequency of about 10 kHz. The operating principles are much the same as for a torsional oscillator. When the thin film is adsorbed onto the surface of the crystal, the resonant frequency of the quartz crystal drops. As the crystal is cooled through the superfluid transition, the superfluid decouples and the frequency increases.

Some results

The KT theory has been confirmed in a set of experiments by Bishop and Reppy in planar films, i.e. Helium films on mylar . Specifically, they found that the transition temperature scaled with film thickness and the superfluid transition is found in films as thin as 5% of a monolayer. More recently, it has been found that near the transition temperature when the correlation lengths exceed any relevant length scale in the system, a multiply connected film will behave as a 3D system near its critical point.

See also
 Bose–Einstein condensate
 Quantum vortex
 Supersolid

Notes

References
  

Superfluidity